The 20th National Geographic Bee was held in Washington, D.C. on May 21, 2008, sponsored by the National Geographic Society. The final competition was moderated by Jeopardy! host Alex Trebek. The winner was Akshay Rajagopal of Lincoln, Nebraska, who won a $25,000 college scholarship and lifetime membership in the National Geographic Society. The 2nd-place winner, Hunter Bledsoe of Alabama, won a $15,000 scholarship. The 3rd-place winner, William Lee of Joyce Middle School in Woburn, Massachusetts, won a $10,000 scholarship.

References

External links
 National Geographic Bee Official Website

National Geographic Bee